Çam (pronounced cham) may refer to:

 Çam Albanians, an Albanian subgroup formerly residing in Greece
 Cham Albanian dialect
 Çam, Akyurt, a neighbourhood in Ankara Province, Turkey
 Gizem Çam (born 1991), Turkish swimmer
 Serdar Çam (born 1966), Turkish bureaucrat

See also 
 Cham (disambiguation)
 Cam (disambiguation)